Robert Street (called Capitol East until November 2011) is a light rail station along the Metro Green Line in Saint Paul, Minnesota. It is located on the west side of Robert Street between 14th Street and Columbus Avenue. This is in an area of government buildings a short distance from the Minnesota State Capitol.

Construction in this area began in August 2010.  This station opened along with the rest of the line in 2014.

References

External links
Metro Transit: Robert Street Station

Metro Green Line (Minnesota) stations in Saint Paul, Minnesota
Railway stations in the United States opened in 2014
2014 establishments in Minnesota